Martin Damm Sr. (born 1 August 1972) is a former professional tennis player from the Czech Republic. He is best known as a doubles player (his highest ranking being No. 5 in the world in April 2007). His highest singles ranking was No. 42 in August 1997. Damm won a total of 40 titles in doubles, including one Grand Slam title. He reached five singles finals. He played his last tournament in September 2011 at the US Open (with Radek Štěpánek) and lost to Colin Fleming and Ross Hutchins 6–3, 6–3.

Personal life 
Damm is married to Michaela Damm. They have two sons (Maxmillian Martin (born 1 February 2002) and Martin Jr. (born 30 September 2003)) and one daughter (Laura Michelle Damm (born 3 December 2007)). All were born in Bradenton, Florida.

Grand Slam finals

Doubles: 3 (1–2)

Mixed Doubles: 1 (0–1)

Career finals

Doubles (40 wins, 24 losses)

ATP Tour and Challenger finals

Singles (5–12)

Doubles performance timeline

External links

 
 
 

1972 births
Living people
Sportspeople from Liberec
Czech male tennis players
Olympic tennis players of the Czech Republic
Czech people of German descent
Tennis players at the 2004 Summer Olympics
Tennis players at the 2008 Summer Olympics
US Open (tennis) champions
Grand Slam (tennis) champions in men's doubles
Czechoslovak male tennis players